In mathematics, particularly in differential geometry, an osculating plane is a plane in a Euclidean space or affine space which meets a submanifold at a point in such a way as to have a second order of contact at the point.  The word osculate is from the Latin osculatus which is a past participle of osculari, meaning to kiss.  An osculating plane is thus a plane which "kisses" a submanifold.

The osculating plane in the geometry of Euclidean space curves can be described in terms of the Frenet-Serret formulas as the linear span of the tangent and normal vectors.

See also 
 Normal plane (geometry)
 Osculating circle
 Differential geometry of curves#Special Frenet vectors and generalized curvatures

References

Differential geometry